The goal of the LOPES project (LOwer-extremity Powered ExoSkeleton) is to design and implement a gait rehabilitation robot for treadmill training. The target group consists of people who have had a stroke and have impaired motor control.
The main goals of LOPES are:
Reduction of the physical load on the therapist / patient;
More efficient gait training for stroke patients;
Selective support of gait functions;
Therapist stays in charge of high-level decisions.

The mechanical construction should offer assistance in leg movements in the forward direction and in keeping lateral balance. Within the LOPES project, it has been decided to realize this by connecting the limbs of the patient to an exoskeleton so that robot and patient move in parallel. Most gait rehabilitation robots that are currently being developed [1, 2] focus on the support of the entire gait cycle as a single unit. These robots use joint trajectories of the entire gait cycle and
offer a uniform (more or less) stiff control along this trajectory. This means that the patient receives support in gait phases where support is necessary but also in phases where support isn't necessary. Studies have been done on an exoskeleton [3]  that propose adaptive control methods which minimize the interaction forces with the patient with respect to an adaptable reference pattern, but these still control the entire gait cycle. Studies have also shown that walking with the  Lokomat requires significantly less energy than normal walking [4]. LOPES aims to support
and not take over those tasks that the patient is unable to perform without help using an impedance control scheme. This will lead to a more active participation from the patient's side. The tradeoff for more active walking will likely be a smaller overall distance during therapy sessions. The implication of selective function support is that the robot will have two extreme modes in which it should be able to function, these are:

Patient in charge: The goal of the robot is to minimize the interaction forces between the patient and the robot in order for the patient to walk freely without feeling the robot. This mode will be active mostly for the non-paretic side of the patient and during those phases of the walking cycle that the robot does not need to assist.
Robot in charge: The goal of this mode is to take control of the patient. The robot will take over the functions which the patient is unable to perform. The robot will most likely operate somewhere between these extremes offering some support at those phases when it is needed to guide the patient towards desirable behavior.

The first prototype has been completed. This prototype has 8 actuated DOF ( series elastic actuation) following the design as in [5].  Clinical evaluations will be done in the course of 2007.

References

1.	Colombo, G., et al., Treadmill training of paraplegic patients using a robotic orthosis. Journal of Rehabilitation Research and Development, 2000. 37(6): p. 693-700.
2.	Schmidt, H., et al., Development of a robotic walking simulator for gait rehabilitation. Biomedizinische Technik, 2003. 48(10): p. 281-286.
3.	Jezernik, S., G. Colombo, and M. Morari, Automatic gait-pattern adaptation algorithms for rehabilitation with a 4-DOF robotic orthosis. Robotics and Automation, IEEE Transactions on, 2004. 20(3): p. 574.
4.	C. Krewer, F.M., B. Husemann, S. Heller, J. Quintern, E. Koenig. Energy expenditure of hemiparetic patients and healthy subjects: walking in a lokomat vs. on a treadmill. in Evidence-Based Medicine in Neurorehabilitation. 2004. Zürich.
5.J. Veneman, R.E., R. Kruidhof, F.C.T. van der Helm, H. van der Kooy, Design of a Series Elastic- and Bowdencable-based actuation system for use as torque-actuator in exoskeleton-type training robots. proceedings of the Icorr 2005, 2005.

External links
 

Robotic exoskeletons
Robots of the United States
Rehabilitation robots
2006 robots